Vatici is a commune in Orhei District, Moldova. It is composed of three villages: Curchi, Tabăra and Vatici.

The Orthodox Curchi Monastery is located in the commune.

References

Communes of Orhei District